Paramount Television Studios is the television arm of American film studio Paramount Pictures, a division of Paramount Global, founded on March 4, 2013, by Viacom following an emerging vigorous business with the technological expansion of television via streaming services. Paramount also recognized that television could give them little to fall back on when films fail, except for studio stage rentals.

It is the revival and successor to Paramount's original television division, which rebranded as CBS Paramount Television and was transferred to CBS Corporation during its split from the original Viacom, which retained all of Paramount Pictures, on January 1, 2006. After the expiration of a 3-year licensing agreement between the split companies for the "Paramount" trademarks, the division rebranded to CBS Television Studios on May 17, 2009 and then currently CBS Studios in 2020. On January 14, 2020, following the closed merger of the second Viacom Inc. and CBS Corporation to form ViacomCBS (now called Paramount Global), the division rebranded as Paramount Television Studios.

History
On March 4, 2013, then-president and then-CEO of Viacom Philippe Dauman announced that Paramount opted to produce a television series based on one of their films. The show would allow Paramount to “get back, with very little investment, into the television production business.” Hours later, Paramount chairman/CEO Brad Grey announced that the studio was co-producing a CBS television series based on Beverly Hills Cop with Sony Pictures Television; however, the pilot did not move forward.

On July 22, 2013, Amy Powell was named president of Paramount Television. Until the re-merger of CBS Corporation and Viacom on December 4, 2019, the revived Paramount Television had no ties to the CBS network unlike the previous incarnation in its later years before the Viacom/CBS split.

A television series based on the 2003 film School of Rock was announced to air on Nickelodeon. On August 26, 2014, Paramount and HBO announced plans to develop a new series titled Ashecliffe which will serve as a prequel to the 2010 Paramount film Shutter Island.

On May 27, 2014, Anonymous Content signed a 3-year first-look deal with Paramount Television to produce and distribute scripted programming. On October 23, 2014, Chapter Eleven, the production company of Kyle Killen and Scott Pennington, signed a 2-year deal with Paramount Television and Anonymous Content after Killen left 20th Century Fox Television.

On July 14, 2014, Robert Zemeckis, his producing partner Jack Rapke and their production company, Compari Entertainment, signed a 2-year first-look pact with Paramount Television. On January 6, 2017, Paramount Television signed a first-look agreement with Federation Entertainment. On July 19, 2018, Paramount Television fired its president Powell, following reports that several people had "concerns around [Powell's] comments [made in a] professional setting which they believed were inconsistent" with Viacom's and Paramount's values; claims which Powell countered and was considering legal action. On September 5, 2018, she was replaced as Paramount Television president Nicole Clemens.

Viacom indicated that Paramount Television generated $400 million in revenue and produced 9 series at the end-of-year review in 2018. In 2019, Paramount's chief executive Jim Gianopulos indicated that Paramount Television would have 20 series in production and double its profit. On August 16, 2021, following the rebrand, Auriel Rudnick had signed an overall deal with Paramount Television Studios.

Productions

Paramount Worldwide Television Licensing & Distribution

Paramount Worldwide Television Licensing & Distribution is the television distribution and broadcast syndication arm of Paramount Television Studios, the television arm of Paramount Pictures, a subsidiary of Paramount Global.

It is the successor to Paramount's original syndication arm, Paramount Domestic Television, which was renamed to CBS Paramount Domestic Television on January 17, 2006, and later was merged with King World Productions to form CBS Television Distribution (now CBS Media Ventures) on September 26, 2006. It is also the successor to Paramount's original international distribution arm, Paramount International Television, which was merged with CBS Broadcast International to form CBS Paramount International Television in August 2004, and was later renamed to CBS Studios International on May 20, 2009.

Paramount Pictures returned to television operations on March 4, 2013, forming a new syndication unit in the process.

Currently, Paramount owns the television distribution rights to the following film and television shows:

Films
 Paramount Pictures (post-1949 films)
 DreamWorks Pictures (pre-2010 films)
 DreamWorks Animation (2006–2012 films) under license from Universal Pictures
 Television rights to films from The Cannon Group, Epic Productions and Nelson Entertainment under license from Metro-Goldwyn-Mayer and Carolco Pictures under license from StudioCanal
 Rysher Entertainment film catalog; including titles from Bing Crosby Productions
 Miramax film catalog; including titles from the pre-2005 Dimension Films library
 CBS Films catalog

Shows

 Spin City
 Freaks and Geeks
 Undeclared
 PEN15
 Berlin Station
 Condor
 Boomerang
 First Wives Club
 American Gigolo
 Dwight in Shining Armor
 The Great

See also
 CBS Studios, the corporate sibling of Paramount Television Studios 
 Paramount Television, the original incarnation of this division
 Paramount Domestic Television, the television distribution arm of the original Paramount Television
 CBS Media Ventures
 Desilu Productions, the predecessor to the television division of Paramount Pictures
 Viacom Productions
 Paramount Pictures
 List of Paramount Pictures executives

References

External links 
 Official website

Paramount Television
Paramount Pictures
Television production companies of the United States
Television syndication distributors
American companies established in 2013
Mass media companies established in 2013
Re-established companies
Paramount Global subsidiaries